Larin or Larín is a given name and a surname. As a surname, in Slavic countries it is used only for men, alongside its feminine counterpart Larina. It may refer to

Given name
Larin Paraske (1833–1904), Izhorian oral poet

Pen name
Larin-Kyösti, pseudonym of the Finnish poet Karl Gustaf Larson (1873–1948) 

Surname
Alexander Larín (born 1992), Salvadoran association-football player
Anna Larina (1914–1996), second wife of the Bolshevik leader Nikolai Bukharin
Cyle Larin (born 1995), Canadian association-football player
Dmitry Larin (born 1973), Russian association-football manager
Ivan Larin (1926–1986), Russian football-player and coach
Kim McLarin, African-American novelist
Liz Larin, Detroit-based singer-songwriter
Oleksiy Larin (born 1994), Ukrainian football-player
Rafael Menjívar Larín (1935–2000), Salvadoran economist and politician
Sergei Larin (born 1986), Kazakhstani football-manager and former player
Sergej Larin (1956–2008), Soviet operatic tenor
Sergejus Larinas, Latvian-Russian opera singer
Tatiana Larina, a major character in Alexander Pushkin's 1825-1833 poem Yevgeniy Onegin
Valeria Larina (1926–2008), Russian realist painter
Vassa Larin (born 1970), American author 
Vladimir Larin (1948–1995), Russian football player
Yuri Larin (1882–1932), Soviet economist and politician